Żabików may refer to: 

Żabików, Łódź Voivodeship
Żabików, Lublin Voivodeship

See also
 Żabikowo (disambiguation)